Emily Anne Travers (born 29 July 1978) is a New Zealand former cricketer who played as a wicket-keeper. She appeared in 3 One Day Internationals for New Zealand in 2000, including two matches at the 2000 World Cup. She played domestic cricket for Central Districts and Canterbury.

After retiring from cricket, she continued to develop her successful career in commercial events and sport administration working for organisations such as IAG New Zealand, Auckland Rugby/Blues, The Radio Network and NZME. While working full time, she was also one of the first female members of the Sky TV domestic cricket commentary team and went on to present Sky TV's "Cricket Company", as well as presenting for the TAB within Sky TV's cricket, netball, tennis and darts coverage.

References

External links

1978 births
Living people
People from Hunterville
New Zealand women cricketers
New Zealand women One Day International cricketers
Central Districts Hinds cricketers
Canterbury Magicians cricketers
Wicket-keepers